The Robinson Baronetcy, of Hawthornden, Wynberg, in the Cape Province of South Africa, and Dudley House in the City of Westminster, was created in the Baronetage of the United Kingdom on 27 July 1908 for the South African mining magnate Joseph Robinson. He was nominated for a peerage in 1922 but declined the honour. The second Baronet was a member of the Parliament of South Africa.

Robinson baronets, of Hawthornden and Dudley House (1908)
Sir Joseph Benjamin Robinson, 1st Baronet (1840–1928)
Sir Joseph Benjamin Robinson, 2nd Baronet (1887–1954)
Sir Wilfred Henry Frederick Robinson, 3rd Baronet (1917–2012)
Sir Peter Frank Robinson, 4th Baronet (born 1949)

See also
 Robinson baronets

Notes

Baronetcies in the Baronetage of the United Kingdom
1908 establishments in the United Kingdom